Lysosomal lipase is a form of lipase which functions intracellularly, in the lysosomes.

Biochemical Significance 
The primary function of lysosomal lipase is to hydrolyze lipids such as triglycerides and cholesterol. These fats are transported and degraded into free fatty acids. Lysosomal lipases function optimally at an acidic pH which are complementary with the environment found in the lysosomal lumen. These enzymes were believed to only hydrolyze the lipids found in organelle membranes and extracellular lipids. However, recent studies suggest that lysosomal lipases also play a significant role in the degradation of cytosolic lipids, a characteristic that was previously limited to neutral lipases. The ability of the lysosome to degrade a diverse set of cargo is attributed to the lysosomal lipase and other soluble hydrolases. These enzymes include sulphatases, phosphatases, peptidases, glycosidases, and nucleases.

The biochemical role of these enzymes are observed in various pathways, specifically in lipid catabolism. At the intracellular level, the byproducts released by the lysosomal lipase are recycled for membrane assembly and energy production. In addition, these enzymes participate in the production of specific fatty acids necessary for the metabolic reprogramming of CD8+ memory T cells, macrophage alternative activation, and lipid mediator synthesis. As observed, the degradation of these lipids are essential to maintain homeostasis within the body. The absence or decreased activity of this enzyme could lead to various metabolic disorders.

Clinical significance
A deficiency associated with lysosomal acid lipase deficiency, Wolman disease, and cholesteryl ester storage disease.

Chlorpromazine is an inhibitor of lysosomal lipase.

A genome wide survey suggests that lysosomal lipase A (located at chromosome 10q23.31) is associated with coronary artery disease in humans.

References

External links